The fencing event at the 2022 Mediterranean Games took place from 3 to 5 July in Oran, Algeria.

Athletes competed in six events. There were no team events.

Medal summary

Men's events

Women's events

Medal table

References

External links
2022 Mediterranean Games – Fencing
Results book

Sports at the 2022 Mediterranean Games
2022
Mediterranean Games